Ailton dos Santos Silva (born 31 October 1966) is a Brazilian football manager.

Managerial career
Born in São Paulo, Silva began his managerial career at São Paulo Futebol Center, a São Paulo youth system based in Osasco, in 1996. In 2005, he joined Palmeiras, also taking care of the club's youth setup.

Silva left Verdão in 2007, and moved to Spanish Tercera División side CF Atlético Ciudad, being appointed as a sports director. He returned to his homeland in the following year, being named Santo André's assistant manager.

After being in the staff of São Bento, Desportivo Brasil and Portuguesa, Silva was appointed River Plate-SE manager on 1 February 2011. He led the latter to their second Campeonato Sergipano title of its history, and also managed the side in both Série D and Copa do Brasil.

Silva moved to São Caetano in the following year, as an assistant manager. In November, he was appointed as caretaker, replacing fired Émerson Leão.

Silva was relieved from his duties on 5 February 2013, but returned to Azulão on 13 March. He was sacked again on the 28th, and moved to Mogi Mirim on 16 May.

Silva was sacked on 27 February 2014, and was appointed Ferroviária manager on 1 August. He was relieved from his duties on 2 October, and signed for Portuguesa on 15 December.

On 6 April 2015 Silva was dismissed, with Lusa being almost relegated. On 1 June he returned to Mogi Mirim, replacing fired Edinho. He subsequently worked at Juventus, Itabaiana, Campinense, Confiança and Juazeirense.

In October 2019, Silva was appointed Chiangrai United manager, and led the club to their first-ever Thai League 1 accolade. The following July, he switched teams and countries again, taking over Hồ Chí Minh City in Vietnam.

Managerial statistics

Honours
River Plate-SE
Campeonato Sergipano: 2011

Chiangrai United
Thai League 1: 2019

Individual
Thai League 1 Coach of the Month: August 2019
Thai League 1 Coach of the Year: 2019

References

External links
Grande Área profile 

1966 births
Living people
Sportspeople from São Paulo
Brazilian football managers
Campeonato Brasileiro Série B managers
Campeonato Brasileiro Série C managers
Associação Desportiva São Caetano managers
Mogi Mirim Esporte Clube managers
Associação Ferroviária de Esportes managers
Associação Portuguesa de Desportos managers
Clube Atlético Juventus managers
Associação Olímpica de Itabaiana managers
Campinense Clube managers
Associação Desportiva Confiança managers
Ailton Silva
Ailton Silva
Brazilian expatriate football managers
Brazilian expatriate sportspeople in Thailand
Brazilian expatriate sportspeople in Vietnam
Expatriate football managers in Thailand
Expatriate football managers in Vietnam